Lago Norte is an administrative region in the Federal District in Brazil. Most of its inhabited area is located on a peninsula on Lake Paranoá. In 2010, its population was 41,627.

See also
List of administrative regions of the Federal District

References

External links

 Regional Administration of Lago Norte website
 Government of the Federal District website

Administrative regions of Federal District (Brazil)